The Teochew Cemetery is a large cemetery in Bangkok's Sathon District. The cemetery was founded in 1899 and actually consists of adjacent cemeteries managed by three organisations, namely the Tio Chew Association of Thailand, the Poh Teck Tung Foundation and the Hainan Dan Family Association. In 1996, the district administration began renovating the derelict site, and part of the cemetery now also serves as a public park.

References

Cemeteries in Thailand
Parks in Bangkok
Chinese-Thai culture
Sathon district